The European Public Health Association (EUPHA) is an organization of public health associations and institutes in Europe. It was founded in 1992.

Its central office is based at the NIVEL (Nederlands instituut voor onderzoek van de gezondheidszorg) in Utrecht, Netherlands. EUPHA also has a satellite office in Brussels, Belgium.

EUPHA is co-funded by the Health Programme of the European Union, and is registered with the EU Transparency Register under No. 37673629826-90.

Members
EUPHA has two sorts of membership: full membership, which is open for national public health associations in Europe (WHO/EURO definition of Europe) and the associate membership, open for individuals, international NGOs and public health institutions. , EUPHA has 80 members from 47 countries.

Pillars
In order to better support the activities of EUPHA and to include all aspects of public health, EUPHA has created four pillars to link EUPHA sections and EUPHA members. These pillars reflect the four working areas of public health: research, policy, practice and training and education.

European Public Health Conference
EUPHA has been organising annual scientific conferences since 1992. The first conference was held in Paris in December 1992. Since 2008 the annual conference name was changed to "European Public Health Conference", as the conferences are a joint effort with national public health associations and international partners. The EPH Conference usually takes place in different European cities every year.

In 2020, together with the World Federation of Public Health Associations (WFPHA) and the Italian Society of Hygiene, Preventive Medicine and Public Health (SItI), EUPHA organised the first online edition of 16th World Congress on Public Health, focused on 'Public health for the future of humanity: analysis, advocacy and action'.

In 2021, the virtual edition of the 14th EPH Conference will explore "public health futures in a changing world".

Journal

EUPHA publishes a bi-monthly scientific journal, the European Journal of Public Health, together with Oxford University Press. In 2021, the Impact Factor is of 2.391 and the 5 year Impact Factor of 3.134.

The editor-in-chief is Peter Allebeck, from the Karolinska Institute and Stockholm County Council, Sweden.

Past presidents
Dr Natasha Azzopardi-Muscat, Malta (2016–2020)
Prof Martin McKee, United Kingdom (2015-2016)
Prof Walter Ricciardi, Italy (2010–2014)
Prof Stanislaw Tarkowski, Poland (2010) 
Prof Constantino Sakellarides, Portugal(2009)
Prof Ilmo Keskimäki, Finland (2008)
Prof John-Paul Vader, Switzerland (2007)
Prof Horst Noack, Austria (2006)
Prof Gunnar Tellnes, Norway (2005)
Prof Walter Ricciardi, Italy (2004)
Prof Wilhelm Kirch, Germany (2003)
Dr Viviane Van Casteren, Belgium (2002)
Prof Marc Brodin, France (2000–2001)
Prof Alena Petráková, Sweden (1999)
Prof Peter Allebeck, Sweden (1998)
Prof Carlos Alvarez-Dardet, Spain (1997)
Prof Klim McPherson, United Kingdom (1996)
Prof Ferenc Bojan, Hungary (1995)
Mrs Louise Gunning-Schepers, Netherlands (1992–1994)

References and notes

External links

Official website
European Journal of Public Health
European Public Health Conference

European medical and health organizations
Public health organizations
Organizations established in 1992
Medical and health organisations based in the Netherlands
1992 establishments in Europe